The 2002 Britannic Asset Management International Championships was a women's tennis tournament played on grass courts at the Eastbourne Tennis Centre in Eastbourne, United Kingdom that was part of Tier II of the 2002 WTA Tour. It was the 28th edition of the tournament and was held from 17 until 22 June 2002. Unseeded Chanda Rubin won the singles title.

Finals

Singles

 Chanda Rubin defeated  Anastasia Myskina 6–1, 6–3
 It was Rubin's 1st singles title of the year and the 4th of her career.

Doubles

 Lisa Raymond /  Rennae Stubbs defeated  Cara Black /  Elena Likhovtseva 6–7(5–7), 7–6(8–6), 6–2
 It was Raymond's 7th doubles title of the year and the 34th of her career. It was Stubbs' 7th title of the year and the 38th of her career.

External links 
 WTA tournament profile
 ITF tournament profile

References

Britannic Asset Management International Championships
Eastbourne International
2002 in English women's sport
June 2002 sports events in the United Kingdom
2002 in English tennis